Egil H. Thomassen  is a Norwegian aerophilatelist who was appointed to the Roll of Distinguished Philatelists in 2000. His collections have earned Large Gold medals at PACIFIC 97 and ISRAEL 98. He has been president of the Federation of Norwegian Philatelists.

Selected publications
 Norwegian Air Mail Handbook
 Guidelines for Aerophilately

References

Signatories to the Roll of Distinguished Philatelists
Fellows of the Royal Philatelic Society London
Norwegian philatelists
Living people
Year of birth missing (living people)